Melbourn Village College is a secondary school with academy status, located in Melbourn, Cambridgeshire, England that serves an extensive area of South Cambridgeshire. The school has over 500 students aged 11–16. Melbourn Village College is part of the Comberton Academy Trust as of September 1, 2013. The Comberton Academy Trust now comprises Comberton Village College, Comberton Sixth Form, Cambourne Village College, Melbourn Village College and The Voyager.

History
Since September 2002, Melbourn Village College has specialised in Performing Arts with Music, Drama and Dance as its subject specialisms.

In its report on its 6 October 2005 inspection, Ofsted rated the school Good, point two on a four-point scale saying "Melbourn Village College is a good school with some outstanding features. The college is well viewed by its students and their parents, and with just cause." On 21 June 2007.

The following components were rated Outstanding:
 How well does the school work in partnership with others to promote learners' well-being
 How good is the overall personal development and well-being of the
learners
 How well are learners cared for, guided and supported
 How well equality of opportunity is promoted and discrimination tackled so that all learners achieve as well as they can
 How effectively and efficiently resources are deployed to achieve value for money

In 2006 59% of students obtained 5 or more A*-C GCSEs including English and mathematics, rising to 63% if those two subjects are excluded.

In the most recent full Ofsted inspection in 2013, Melbourn Village College maintained its Good rating.

Curriculum
The following subjects are offered/taught: English, Maths (plus Further Maths in Year 11), Science, Geography, History, Religious Education, Food Technology, Wood Technology, Art, Physical Education, German, French, Mandarin, Spanish, Music, Dance, Drama, ICT, and extra Literacy for people who don't do German.

Funding
In January 2000 the Secondary Heads Association used this school as an example of the disparity of funding between local authorities. If the school had been in Hertfordshire, two miles away, it would have received £359,000 more for its students. By November 2005 the school was £148,814 in debt.

Notable staff
In 1998 Judith Mullen, then warden of the College, was appointed president of the Secondary Heads Association.

In April 2006 Nicola Dunklin, a teaching assistant, set up the South Cambridgeshire branch of the charity, Friends of Chernobyl's Children.

Notable former pupils 
 Luke Chadwick, professional football player
 Daniel Goodfellow, Olympic bronze medalist at Rio 2016
 Duncan Bellamy, musician - member of Mercury Music Prize nominated band Portico Quartet

References

External links 
Official site
Cambridgeshire County Council
Ofsted Reports
DCSF Performance Tables

Academies in Cambridgeshire
Secondary schools in Cambridgeshire
Village College